The Alta class is a ship class of minesweepers operated by the Royal Norwegian Navy.

Design
The Alta class was built by Kværner Mandal during 1996 and 1997, while the related Oksøy class was built in 1994 and 1995. A total of 9 vessels were built, 5 minesweepers and 4 minehunters. The catamaran hull is built in a fibre-reinforced plastic sandwich of very low magnetic signature.

Two large fans located on each side create an air cushion between the two hulls and a front and aft rubber skirt, lifting the vessel, giving small drag and a high cruise speed, as well as low susceptibility to the shock of exploding mines since only a small portion of the hull is actually exposed in the water. Propulsion by water jet, again one in each hull, gives a low acoustic signature. A degaussing system gives the vessels extremely low electromagnetic signature.

Ships

Service history
Orkla was destroyed by fire on 19 November 2002. Glomma is no longer in active service. Alta was scrapped along with the Oksøy class M341 Karmøy prior to 23 July 2022

References

External links
Oksøy and Alta class
 Alta class
Alta / Oksoy Surface Effect Ship (SES)

Mine warfare vessel classes
Minesweepers of the Royal Norwegian Navy